The Cathedral of the Sacred Heart is the mother church of the Roman Catholic Diocese of Winona-Rochester. The cathedral is located in Winona, Minnesota, United States, on Minnesota State Highway 43 near downtown.

History

Sacred Heart parish was established in 1952. It was a merger between St. Thomas and St. Joseph parishes whose facilities stood four blocks apart.

The Pro-Cathedral of St. Thomas was established as the city's first parish in 1857. Minnesota's first bishop, the Rt. Rev. Joseph Cretin, had celebrated the first recorded Mass in town the previous year and sent the Rev. Thomas Murray to organize the parish. St. Thomas parish had two church buildings in its history, the second of which was completed in the early 1870s. It became the pro-cathedral when the Diocese of Winona was established in 1889 and its pastor, the Rev. Joseph Cotter, was named the first bishop of Winona.

St. Joseph parish was established in 1862 to serve the spiritual needs of Winona's German Catholics. It also had two church buildings in its history, the second of which was completed in the early 1880s.

As the diocese grew, it was determined that St. Thomas was not an adequate facility for a cathedral.  A fund drive to build a new cathedral was initiated in 1944. On June 15, 1950, the Holy See approved the petition to merge the two parishes.  At the time of their merger St. Thomas had about 600 households and St. Joseph had more than 300. The parish was established in 1952 when the present cathedral was completed.  Sacred Heart and St. Casimir parishes have subsequently been clustered. St. Casimir's was founded in 1905 from St. Stanislaus Kostka parish.

See also
List of Catholic cathedrals in the United States
List of cathedrals in the United States
 List of Catholic churches in the United States

References

External links
Official Cathedral Site
Roman Catholic Diocese of Winona Official Site

Buildings and structures in Winona, Minnesota
Churches in the Roman Catholic Diocese of Winona-Rochester
Churches in Winona County, Minnesota
Christian organizations established in 1952
Sacred Heart Winona
Roman Catholic churches completed in 1952
1952 establishments in Minnesota
20th-century Roman Catholic church buildings in the United States